Bas-Armagnac is one of the three plantation areas in the Armagnac area of France where grapes for the distillation of the Armagnac eau-de-vie can be cultivated. It extends over the Landes and Gers departments and represents 57% of the vineyards. It lies in the west, beside Armagnac-Ténarèze, an undulating area; the grapes grow in acidic, argillaceous and stony ground. Iron rust colors parts of the soil and these spots are called ’’sables fauves’’. Major towns in the Armagnac region include Eauze, Cazaubon and Nogaro.

The most famous producers of Nogaro : Maison Dartigalongue, Domaine de Joÿ, Château de Laubade, Domaine de Miquer, Domaine de Lassaubatju etc.

The most famous producers of Cazaubon : Domaine de Boingnères, Château de Briat, Domaine de Laberdolive, Domaine de Luquet, Domaine d'Espérance, Château Garreau, Château Laballe etc.

The most famous producers of Villeneuve-de-Marsan : Maison Darroze, Chateau de Monbel,
Château de Lacquy, Château de Maniban, Domaine de Maouhum, Domaine d'Ognoas, Domaine de Petita etc.

See also
Appellation d'Origine Contrôlée
Côtes de Gascogne
Floc de Gascogne

References

Armagnac